Bowmansville Roller Mill, also known as the Von Nieda Mill, is a historic roller mill and national historic district located at Bowmansville, Brecknock Township in Lancaster County, Pennsylvania. The district encompasses two contributing buildings and one contributing structure.  The grist / roller mill was built in 1850, and is a 3 1/2-story, rectangular brownstone building measuring 45 feet by 50 feet, 5 inches.  The property includes a two-story, brownstone and frame sawmill, and a headrace and tailrace.  The mills closed about 1945.

It was listed on the National Register of Historic Places in 1990.

References 

Grinding mills on the National Register of Historic Places in Pennsylvania
Industrial buildings completed in 1850
Buildings and structures in Lancaster County, Pennsylvania
Grinding mills in Pennsylvania
Historic districts on the National Register of Historic Places in Pennsylvania
National Register of Historic Places in Lancaster County, Pennsylvania